The Bank of Marshall Building is a historic commercial building at the southeast corner of Main and Center Streets in downtown Marshall, Arkansas.  It is a -story brick masonry structure, built in 1913-14 by Jasper Treece, a local builder, in a vernacular Colonial Revival style.  Its front facade is three bays wide, with an arched window bay to the left of the central entrance, and a square window bay to the right.  A narrow band of windows is set in the half story, highlighted by bands of stone acting as sills and lintels.  The bank, established in 1914, and apparently failed during the Great Depression.

The building was listed on the National Register of Historic Places in 1993.

See also
National Register of Historic Places listings in Searcy County, Arkansas

References

Bank buildings on the National Register of Historic Places in Arkansas
Colonial Revival architecture in Arkansas
Buildings and structures in Searcy County, Arkansas
1913 establishments in Arkansas
National Register of Historic Places in Searcy County, Arkansas
Commercial buildings completed in 1913